Peter Nilsson (born June 10, 1962) is a Swedish ice hockey player. Nilsson began playing hockey in Hammarby IF at a senior level in 1978. He joined  Djurgårdens IF in 1983. During his 12 seasons for Djurgården, he played a total of 510 Elitserien games and scored 341 points before moving back to his first club Hammarby in 1995. Nilsson ended his professional career in Södertälje SK in 1998.
He later played Division 3-hockey for Bajen Fans IF, a club founded by Hammarby supporters after the club's bankruptcy in 2008.

Career statistics

References

External links

Djurgårdens IF Hockey players
Södertälje SK players
1962 births
Swedish ice hockey centres
Living people
Winnipeg Jets (1979–1996) draft picks
Ice hockey people from Stockholm